Gupodaegyo is a bridge in Busan, South Korea. The bridge connects the districts of Gangseo District and Buk District. The bridge was completed in 1993.

Bridges completed in 1993
Bridges in Busan
Gangseo District, Busan
Buk District, Busan
Bridges over the Nakdong River